The PL-5 (霹雳-5) air-to-air missile (PL stands for Pi Li, "Thunderbolt" in Chinese, the generic designation for all PRC air-to-air missiles) is a short-range, Infrared homing missile used by Chinese fighters. It is based on AA-2 Atoll technology and resembles the AIM-9 Sidewinder.
The PL-5 was designed and developed at China's Luoyang Electro-Optics Technology Development Centre (EOTDC), also known as Institute 612; its design team members included Chen Jiali (陈家礼), Dong Chunfeng, Hu Rongchao (胡荣超), Huang Bin, Zhang Ming (张明), and Zheng Zhiwei (郑志伟).  It was reportedly produced at the Hanzhong Nanfeng Machine Factory (also known as the Hanzhong Air-to-Air Missile Factory) of the China Aviation Industry Corporation I.

The PL-5 have been continuously upgraded by Luoyang and the latest variant, the PL-5EII, added a dual band, multi-element detector as well as a laser proximity fuse similar to the PL-9. According to the Chinese export/import agency CATIC, the PL5E has an all-aspect capability with the seeker having a maximum off boresight angle of ±25° before launch, and ±40° after launch.

PLAAF J-10 and J-11 fighter jets mainly use the PL-8 missile, which is more advanced when compared to the PL-5. However, due to greater weight and dimensions of the PL-8 missile, for F-7 and JH-7, the PL-5 is still the preferable air-to-air missile at this stage.

Operators

Current operators
  uses PL-5 and PL-5EII
   PL-5B and PL-5EII
 
 
  900 ordered, PL-5E.
 
 
 
  100 ordered, PL-5E.

References

 PL-5 SHORT-RANGE AIR-TO-AIR MISSILE, www.sinodefence.com
 Luoyang Optoelectro Technology Development Center PL-5EII

Air-to-air missiles of the People's Republic of China
Military equipment introduced in the 1980s